The 36th Division was a military formation belonging to the Spanish Republican Army that fought during the Spanish Civil War. It was deployed on the Extremadura front during the entire war.

History 
The unit was created in May 1937, on the Extremadura front. The division was assigned to the VII Army Corps, being located in front of the Tagus River. Subsequently, the division was made up of the 47th, 62nd, 104th and 113th mixed brigades, covering the front that was from the Algodor River to Castilblanco. During the following months, it did not intervene in relevant operations. At the beginning of 1938, it gave up two of its brigades - the 62nd and 104th - with which the Extremadura Division was created.

In July 1938 it took part in the fighting of the Battle of Merida pocket, during which it suffered considerable losses. As of August 11, command was assumed by the militia major José Neira Jarabo. At this time the 36th Division, made up of the 47th, 113th and 148th mixed brigades, became integrated into the VI Army Corps.

Command 
 Commanders
 Antonio Bertomeu Bisquert;
 Francisco Gómez Palacios;
 José Neira Jarabo;

 Commissars
 Francisco Gil Vallejo, of the PCE;
 Dionisio Martín Martínez, of the PCE;
 Pedro Yáñez Jiménez, of the PSOE;

Order of battle

References

Bibliography 
 
  
 
 
 
 

Military units and formations established in 1937
Military units and formations disestablished in 1939
Divisions of Spain
Military units and formations of the Spanish Civil War
Military history of Spain
Armed Forces of the Second Spanish Republic